The Dodge Town Panel and Dodge Town Wagon are respectively a panel truck and a carryall, manufactured between 1954 and 1966 in the USA and between 1954 and 1971 in Argentina by Dodge. The Town Panel and Town Wagon trucks were based upon the design of the Dodge C Series pickup trucks with round fenders and wraparound windshields. Even after the Dodge D Series "Sweptline" pickup trucks with square fenders and flat windshields were released, the Town Wagons retained the 1958 sheet metal design of the C Series pickups and heavy-duty trucks. They were produced until 1966, when the Dodge A100 Commercial and passenger vans eliminated the need for the pickup chassis version. A passenger sport utility version of the Dodge D series truck was not again developed until the third generation D Series based Dodge Ramcharger, a competitor to the Chevrolet Blazer.

Town Panel

The Town Panel truck was introduced in 1954 along with the other Dodge C Series trucks. At the 1954 Chicago Auto Show, a golden Town Panel truck in a "jewel box setting" was used to celebrate the 50th (golden) anniversary of the Chicago Automobile Trade Association. The new Dodge Town Panel styling was heavily promoted. It proved to be popular with local delivery companies, such as Montgomery Ward. The Town Panel had no windows or seats behind the driver and was a commercial-use vehicle. It was designed to protect loads from weather and pilferage. Dodge previously had built panel delivery trucks on their Dodge B Series and older truck chassis prior to the Town Panel, but did not specifically market them separately.

Town Wagon
The Town Wagon was introduced in 1956. It was a passenger version of the Town Panel with rear passenger windows. It had two bench seats and upholstery for a passenger vehicle.  It was competitor with the Chevrolet Suburban, a station wagon body built upon a truck chassis. The Town Wagon, along with truck-chassis wagon competitors from Chevrolet, Jeep, and International, were precursors to the SUV. As American cars were built lower to the ground to run on newer highways and interstates, sportsmen needed higher-riding vehicles to go onto more primitive roads. Dodge would not market another 5-door SUV until 1998 with the Dodge Durango.

Town Wagon Power Wagon

The Town Wagon in factory four wheel drive configuration was called the Town Wagon Power Wagon. It was offered starting in 1957. The Dodge C Series Vehicles were given the W-100 designation for their now available half ton four wheel drive versions.  It had a higher stance and large fender flares. It gained a "Power Wagon" fender badge, along with its W series "Sweptline" pickup variants, linking it to the Dodge Power Wagon WC300 "Military Type".

References

External links 

Another Town Wagon and Town Panel Page
https://www.oldcarsweekly.com/features/car-of-the-week-1965-dodge-town-wagon

https://www.hemmings.com/stories/2018/11/25/hemmings-find-of-the-day-1962-dodge-w100-town-wagon

1950s cars
Cars introduced in 1954
Town Panel
Vans
Sport utility vehicles
Station wagons